This is a list of theatrical comedies.

France 
Les affaires sont les affaires (trans. Business is business), by Octave Mirbeau (1903).
La Puce a l'Oreille (trans. "A Flea in Her Ear"), by Georges Feydeau

India 

 Kithaab. by Rafeeq Mangalassery.

Russia 
The Government Inspector by Nikolai Gogol (made into the Danny Kaye screen musical The Inspector General.)

United Kingdom 
The Importance of Being Earnest by Oscar Wilde (adapted for film and television numerous times)
Much Ado About Nothing and half a dozen others by William Shakespeare
The Rocky Horror Show by Richard O'Brien
Comic operas by Gilbert and Sullivan including H.M.S. Pinafore, The Pirates of Penzance, Patience, Iolanthe, The Mikado and many others.

United States 
A Funny Thing Happened on the Way to the Forum
Grease
Into the Woods
You're a Good Man, Charlie Brown
Personal Appearance
London Calling
Many American stage musicals have a strong comedic element.

See also
Lists of comedy films
List of comedy television series
List of radio comedies

References

Lists of plays